Jean Marie Just Louis Chaland (8 September 1881 – 23 January 1973) was a French ice hockey player. He competed in the men's tournament at the 1920 Summer Olympics.

References

External links
 

1881 births
1973 deaths
Ice hockey players at the 1920 Summer Olympics
Olympic ice hockey players of France
People from Saint-Chamond
Sportspeople from Loire (department)